Gandhi Nagar or Gandhinagar, also Gandhinagaram, is a major commercial area of Vijayawada in NTR district of the Indian state of Andhra Pradesh. It is located in Gandhi Nagar mandal of Vijayawada revenue division. Vijayawada railway station was located here, as is the Pushparam Ghat reservoir, built in 1962.

References 

Neighbourhoods in Vijayawada